The state road D1 is a national highway in Croatia. It is a one-lane highway that spans from Macelj border crossing in the north via Krapina, Zagreb, Karlovac, Slunj, Gračac, Knin, Sinj, ending in Split.

Before the A1 and A2 dual carriage motorways have been completed (in 2005 and 2007 respectively), the D1 was probably the busiest road during the summer in Croatia as it connected the northern border as well as the city of Zagreb with the tourist resorts at the Adriatic Sea. Since then, the traffic has waned significantly, but the D1 remains relevant as an alternative to the tolled highways.

Route description

North of Zagreb the D1 is mostly parallel to the A2 motorway up to the Krapina interchange, connecting to a number of the A2 interchanges directly or via connector roads. It also runs parallel with railway tracks in some sections running through hilly terrain.

A part of the D1 state road is concurrent with other routes: the A2 motorway between Zaprešić and Jankomir interchanges, the A3 motorway between Jankomir and Lučko interchanges, the D3 state road between the A3 motorway Lučko interchange and Karlovac, the D6 state road in Karlovac, the D33 state road in Knin and the D219 state road in Sinj.

Parts of the D1 have been upgraded to expressway (brza cesta) status. Currently two sections of the D1 are considered as such, since they comprise dual carriageways or are currently expanded to four traffic lanes:

 an urban expressway in Karlovac, between the A1 motorway Karlovac interchange and Mostanje
 an expressway in and near Split, between the A1 motorway Dugopolje interchange and Bilice roundabout in Split itself

The northern part of the D1 in Karlovac is actually a slightly lower road category because there are several intersections with traffic lights which slow the traffic down.

Parts of the road in Lika have climbing lanes.

The road, as well as all other state roads in Croatia, is managed and maintained by Hrvatske ceste, a state-owned company.

Traffic volume 

Traffic is regularly counted and reported by Hrvatske ceste, operator of the road. The D1 AADT and ASDT (average summer daily traffic) figure variations observed south of Karlovac are attributed to tourist traffic to various regions of Adriatic Sea coast in Dalmatia region of Croatia.

Road junctions and populated areas

Maps

See also
 A1 motorway
 A2 motorway
 A3 motorway

Sources

External links

D001
D001
D001
D001
D001
D001
D001
D001
Buildings and structures in Krapina-Zagorje County